The 2003 Men's Premier Soccer League season was the inaugural season of the MPSL.

Arizona Sahuaros finished the season as national champions, beating Utah Salt Ratz in the MPSL Championship game

Three of the teams who contested the first season - Arizona Sahuaros, Chico Rooks and Northern Nevada Aces - previously competed in the United Soccer Leagues, but left to form the breakaway MPSL in protest at the way the USL was being run.

Final standings
Purple indicates regular season title clinched
Green indicates playoff berth clinched

* Chico Rooks played only 14 league games as they represented the MPSL In the USASA National Cup.

Playoffs

Semi-finals

Championship

Overtime Note:  2 ten minute periods with Golden Goal. PK's if still tied.

References
 US soccer history archives for 2003

2003
4